Zion is a 2018 short documentary film following Zion Clark, born without legs, growing up in foster care and becoming a wrestler.

The documentary was released on Netflix on August 10, 2018.

References

External links
 
 
 

2018 short documentary films
American short documentary films
Netflix original documentary films
2010s English-language films
2010s American films